Asher Graham Caruth (February 7, 1844 – November 25, 1907) was a U.S. Representative from Kentucky.

Early life and family
Asher G. Caruth was born in Scottsville, Kentucky, on February 7, 1844. He was the third child born to Henry Clay and Mary (Mansfield) Caruth.

Caruth attended the public schools of Philadelphia, Pennsylvania, before graduating from the high school of Louisville in June 1864. Later that year, he became the law librarian of the city of Louisville. He matriculated to the law department of the University of Louisville (now the Louis D. Brandeis School of Law), graduating in March 1866. He was admitted to the bar and commenced practice in Hopkinsville, Kentucky. While there, he established the Kentucky Weekly New Era newspaper.

On February 23, 1871, Caruth married Ella Terry.

Political career
Caruth moved to Louisville in 1871 and continued the practice of law. From 1873 to 1880, he was annually elected attorney of the Board of Trustees of the Louisville Public Schools. In 1876, he served as a Democratic presidential elector for the ticket of Samuel J. Tilden and Thomas Andrews Hendricks. In 1880, he was elected Commonwealth's Attorney for the ninth judicial district of Kentucky for a six-year term. He was re-elected without opposition in 1886.

Caruth resigned as Commonwealth's Attorney in March 1887 after being elected to represent the Fifth District in the U.S. House of Representatives. He served in the Fiftieth and to the three succeeding Congresses (March 4, 1887 – March 3, 1895). He was an unsuccessful candidate for renomination in 1894.

Later life and death
After his tenure in Congress, Caruth resumed the practice of law in Louisville.  He served as judge of the criminal division of the Jefferson County Circuit Court in 1902. He served as commissioner of the St. Louis Exposition in 1904. He died in Louisville on November 25, 1907, and was interred in Cave Hill Cemetery.

References

Bibliography

1844 births
1907 deaths
Burials at Cave Hill Cemetery
Kentucky Commonwealth's Attorneys
Kentucky lawyers
Kentucky state court judges
People from Scottsville, Kentucky
Politicians from Louisville, Kentucky
University of Louisville School of Law alumni
Democratic Party members of the United States House of Representatives from Kentucky
19th-century American politicians
19th-century American judges